Gian Gaspare Napolitano (30 April 1907 – 5 January 1966) was an Italian journalist, screenwriter and film director.

During the 1920s, he wrote for the literary review "900", Cahiers d'Italie et d'Europe. He made ten films between 1935 and 1956. He was a member of the Venice Film Festival jury in 1951, 1953 and 1961. During the Second World War, he was a liaison officer with the Black Watch, and in 1945 he wrote the novel  In guerra con gli scozzesi based on his experiences.

His film Magia verde won the Silver Bear at the Berlin Film Festival and was nominated for the Palme d'Or at Cannes.

Filmography
 Red Passport (1935)
 Sentinels of Bronze (1937)
I've Lost My Husband! (1937)
 I pirati del golfo (1940)
 L'uomo della legione (1940)
 The Cavalier from Kruja (1940)
 Giarabub (1942)
 Noi cannibali (1953)
 Magia verde (1953)
 Tam tam mayumbe (1955)
 War and Peace (1956)

Notes
 Gian Gaspare Napolitano, "Il venditore di fumo", commedia teatrale, Edizioni Sabinae, Roma, 2008.
 Gian Gaspare Napolitano, "Una missione fra i Seris", Edizioni Sabinae, Roma, 2009.

References

External links

1907 births
1966 deaths
20th-century Italian screenwriters
Italian male screenwriters
Italian film directors
20th-century Italian male writers